Jens Henning Fisker Hansen  (10 January 1905 in Frederikssund, Denmark – 21 February 1995), known popularly as Morian Hansen, was a former motorcycle speedway rider from Denmark who rode in the first ever Speedway World Championship Final in 1936.

Hansen's first speedway races were at Copenhagen in 1928.
He first rode in the UK for the West Ham Hammers in 1931 on a two-month permit, returning two years later. He joined the Hackney Wick Wolves in 1935. He then moved onto the Bristol Bulldogs and Wembley Lions before the outbreak of World War II. He competed in the World Championship finals in 1936 and 1937.

Hansen had held a pilot's licence since 1935 and served in the Royal Air Force during WWII, rising to the rank of Squadron Leader.

Awards 
During WWII Hansen was awarded -
 The Distinguished Flying Cross,
 The George Medal,
 The 1939-1945 Star,
 The Air Crew Europe Star,
 The Burma Star and
 The Defence Medal.

World Final Appearances 
 1936 -  London, Wembley Stadium - 11th - 15pts
 1937 -  London, Wembley Stadium - 11th - 15pts

Players cigarette cards
Hansen is listed as number 18 of 50 in the 1930s Player's cigarette card collection.

References 

1905 births
1995 deaths
Danish speedway riders
West Ham Hammers riders
Hackney Wick Wolves riders
Bristol Bulldogs riders
Wembley Lions riders
Recipients of the Distinguished Flying Cross (United Kingdom)
Recipients of the George Medal
Royal Air Force officers
People from Frederikssund Municipality
Sportspeople from the Capital Region of Denmark